{{Album ratings
| MC = 75/100
|rev1=About.com
|rev1score=
|rev2=AbsolutePunk
|rev2score=60%
| rev3 = HM
| rev3score = <ref name=hmmagazine>{{cite journal |url=http://hmmagazine.com/blog/album-reviews/we-came-as-romans-tracing-back-roots/ |title=We Came As Romans - Tracing Back Roots |last=Stagg |first=David|publisher=HM Publications LLC |date=April 13, 2013 |journal=HM Magazine |accessdate=May 14, 2014 |issn=1066-6923 }}</ref>
}}Tracing Back Roots is the third studio album by American metalcore band We Came as Romans. It was released on July 23, 2013, through Equal Vision Records. The album is noted for the band's shift from their signature metalcore sound to a more melodic, clean vocal driven sound, while still maintaining metalcore elements throughout.  The album has been received with favorable reviews which praise the band's “go out and do something with your life with purpose” message.

The album debuted at number 8 on the Billboard 200 with 26,500 copies sold in the first week. As of June 2015, this album has sold 79,000 copies in the United States.

The album's first single, "Hope", was released on January 4, 2013, and is also included on the Understanding What We've Grown to Be'' Deluxe Edition.

Background
During an on-air interview with Jay Hudson of 89X Radio, Joshua Moore stated that they would begin recording their new album with producer John Feldmann in March 2013. According to guitarist Joshua Moore, the band entered the studio on March 13, 2013, and would record the new record for the next seven weeks. Vocalist Dave Stephens announced via Twitter that he would be singing more on this record than the band's previous releases; and also announced on April 23, 2013, that recording had wrapped up. On May 20, 2013, the band, Equal Vision Records and Outerloop Management revealed via online studio updates and social media networks album cover artwork, track listing, and that the band's third full-length album, entitled Tracing Back Roots is scheduled for a July 23, 2013 release.

Videos

On Jan 31, 2013 the music video for the seventh track on the album, "Hope" was posted on the Equal Vision Records YouTube channel.
On 20, December 2013 the music for the sixth track on the album, "Never Let Me Go" was posted on the Nuclear Blast Records YouTube channel.

Cover
The album's cover painting was done by Paul Romano, who also created the cover of the first two albums.

Track listing

Charts

Personnel
We Came as Romans
 David Stephens – lead vocals
 Kyle Pavone – clean vocals, keyboards, piano, synthesizer
 Joshua Moore – lead guitar, backing vocals
 Lou Cotton – rhythm guitar
 Andy Glass – bass guitar, backing vocals
 Eric Choi – drums

Additional personnel
 Aaron Gillespie – additional vocals on "I Survive"

Production
 Produced, mixed & recorded by John Feldmann
 Mastered by Joe Gastwirt
 Additional engineering & mixing by Tommy English
 Management by Mike Mowery and Matthew Stewart
 A&R by Daniel Sandshaw
 Art direction & artwork & design by Paul A. Romano
 Legal by Adam Mandell
 US Booking by JJ Cassiere
 Canada Booking by Adam Sylvester
 Asia / Australia Booking by Dave Shapiro
 Europe Booking by Marco Walzel

References

2013 albums
Equal Vision Records albums
Nuclear Blast albums
We Came as Romans albums